John Butler I of Graveney, Kent, England, was an English politician.
 
Butler was appointed High Sheriff of Kent for 1398–1399 and was elected a Member of Parliament for Kent in May 1413.

Butler married, before June 1398, Joan Faversham (1376–1408), the third daughter of Richard Faversham of Graveney; she eventually inherited her father's estate. They had one daughter, Ann, who married John Martin.

References

Year of birth missing
Year of death missing
People from the Borough of Swale
14th-century births
15th-century deaths
High Sheriffs of Kent
English MPs May 1413